British Physical Laboratories, doing business as BPL Ltd., is an Indian electronics company. It makes consumer electronics and health care equipment. It was founded in 1963 in Palakkad, Kerala, and is headquartered at Bangalore, Karnataka.

History
British Physical Laboratories India Pvt. Ltd. was founded in 1963, during the Licence Raj, by T. P. G. Nambiar in Palakkad, Kerala, as a company for manufacturing hermetically sealed precision panel meters for the defence forces. Nambiar had worked in the United Kingdom and United States, and when he returned to India, he desired to create a company that manufactured high-quality electronic products, and he wanted to make BPL a household name. The initial products were precision measuring instruments such as hermetic sealed panel meters for Bharat Electronics as a subcontract for Indian Army. The newly-founded company was joint venture with the British company of the same name.

Then BPL expanded its medical product ranges to include electrocardiographs and patient-monitoring systems. After the 1982 Asian Games, BPL expanded its range further and manufactured colour televisions and video cassette recorders, and later refrigerators, batteries and other consumer electrical equipment.

The company headquarters was moved to Dynamic House, Church Street, Bangalore. From medical electronics, it expanded into consumer electronics, telecommunications, soft energy and electronic components.

1980s
From 1980 onwards, when the industrial licensing was relaxed, BPL began manufacturing televisions and telecommunications equipment, demonstrating its potential and future business area. It began collaborating with the Japanese Sanyo Electric Company in the early 1980s with a technology-transfer agreement. In the early 1990s, after globalisation and liberalization of the Indian economy, competition entered the market. BPL retained its strong presence and growth rate.

BPL concentrated on importing technology, improving product quality, innovations and manufacturing of electronic products. In late 1980s, BPL had metamorphosed from an entrepreneurial venture, into India's biggest consumer electronics & telecommunication company.

Following economic liberalisation in India in 1991, BPL faced increased competition from South Korean companies LG and Samsung. Internal disputes within the controlling family took away attention from external threats, and the company's fortunes declined. By 2004, BPL and Sanyo were facing serious financial problems due to intense competition in the global electronics market. In 2005, the companies announced a joint-venture, and BPL transferred its colour television business, then worth US$80 million, to the new venture.

BPL was restructured with a focus on energy, healthcare, consumer electronics and home security systems. In 2015, BPL partnered with Flipkart as an online retailer. In 2016, BPL launched new LED TV's like 32 inch and 40 inch etc with a very economical price through E-commerce websites like Flipkart and Amazon.

Performance

The amount was to pay statutory liabilities, unsecured, pressing creditors, dealers, credit balances, employee dues and working capital requirements, in part.

In respect to the auditors' qualification of the company's accounts for the period ended 31 March 2005, about undisputed amounts payable in respect of income-tax, dividend tax, wealth tax, TDS and customs duty.

The balance in customs duty would be paid once the financial restructuring is completed and normalcy of operations is achieved, according to the company.

Joint venture with Sanyo
The BPL Group and Japanese electronics major Sanyo Electric Company Ltd formally started their 50:50 joint venture.

The partners, who had shared a long-standing relationship since 1982, had been off the market for about two years, going through some tough times. In the year 2006, they decided to get back in action together to regain lost market share.

However, they decided to market their brands separately with BPL focusing on the volume segment while Sanyo brand positioned itself as the value driver.

Besides, Sanyo also planned to use India as its sourcing base and has already started sourcing slim TVs from India. It also expected India to contribute five per cent of its global revenues from its operations in India.

In May 2007 after the failure of Sanyo BPL venture. The attrition rate in Sanyo BPL was 70%. BPL concentrated 100% on Healthcare Business group which has its own manufacturing of electromedical equipment such as electrocardiography apparatus and patient monitors.

BPL Medical Technologies 
BPL Medical Technologies was spun off into a separate company in 2013.

See also
 Loop Mobile, formerly BPL Mobile
Rajeev Chandrasekhar

References 

Electronics companies of India
Home appliance manufacturers
Portable audio player manufacturers
Companies based in Bangalore
Electronics companies established in 1963
Indian brands
Health care companies of India
1963 establishments in Kerala
Indian companies established in 1963
Companies listed on the National Stock Exchange of India
Companies listed on the Bombay Stock Exchange
Home appliance manufacturers of India